Calabritto is an Italian town and a commune in the province of Avellino, Campania, Italy.  It occupies a hilly-mountainous area at the eastern tip of the Monti Picentini range.

History
The town was struck by the 1980 Irpinia earthquake on 23 November. The town had to be rebuilt after the serious damage that was inflicted.

Geography
Calabritto is a small town surrounded by the Picentini mountains in the west and crossed by Sele river in its eastern side. It is linked with a mountain road to the ski resort and village of Laceno.

It borders with the municipalities of Acerno (SA), Bagnoli Irpino, Caposele, Lioni, Senerchia and Valva (SA). The only civil parish (frazione) of the municipality is Quaglietta, autonomous municipality merged into Calabritto in 1928.

Culture
In the summer, many religious processions are held. In early July, people walk halfway up one of the mountains to the church of The Madonna, or Mother of Christ.

References

External links

Cities and towns in Campania